The Prize of the City of Münster for International Poetry is a German poetry and translation prize. The prize money is €15,500.

Award winners 
1993 Andrea Zanzotto (poet); Donatella Capaldi, Ludwig Paulmichl and Peter Waterhouse (translators)
1995 Inger Christensen (poet); Hanns Grössel (translator)
1997 Zbigniew Herbert (poet); Klaus Staemmler (translator)
1999 Gellu Naum (poet); Oskar Pastior (translator)
2001 Hugo Claus (poet); Maria Csollány and Waltraud Hüsmert (translator)
2003 Miodrag Pavlović (poet); Peter Urban (translator)
2005 Daniel Bănulescu (poet); Ernest Wichner (translator)
2007 Tomaž Šalamun (poet); Fabjan Hafner (translator)
2009 Caius Dobrescu (poet); Gerhardt Csejka (translator)
2011 Ben Lerner (poet); Steffen Popp (translator)
2013 Derek Walcott; Werner von Koppenfels
2015 Charles Bernstein; VERSATORIUM, Tobias Amslinger, Norbert Lange, Léonce W. Lupette, Mathias Traxler
2017 Jon Fosse; Hinrich Schmidt-Henkel
2019 Eugene Ostashevsky; Monika Rinck, Uljana Wolf
2021 Eugeniusz Tkaczyszyn-Dycki; Uljana Wolf, Michael Zgodzay

References

External links
 
 Stadt Münster: Lyrikertreffen

German literary awards
Translation awards
Culture in Münster